Following Her Heart is a 1994 American made-for-television comedy-drama film directed by actress and filmmaker Lee Grant and written by Merry Helm. The film starred Ann-Margret and George Segal, among others and was first broadcast on NBC on November 28, 1994.

Plot
A dramatic comedy with musical performance sequences, the film follows a recently widowed woman (Ann-Margret) who rediscovers herself while traveling with a group on Grand Ole Opry fans on a guided country music tour. Segal and Grant had worked together on another NBC television film released that same year, Seasons of the Heart.

Cast
Ann-Margret... Ingalill "Lena" Lundquist
George Segal... Harry
Brenda Vaccaro... Cecile
William Morgan Sheppard... Anders Lundquist
Kirk Baltz... Kenny
Scott Marlowe... Frank
Greg Mullavey... Elroy
Alexandra Powers... Nola Lundquist
Travis Tritt... Himself

References

External links

1994 television films
1994 films
1990s musical comedy-drama films
American musical comedy-drama films
Films set in Tennessee
Films shot in Tennessee
Films directed by Lee Grant
Films scored by Mark Snow
NBC network original films
American drama television films
1990s American films